The men's slalom competition of the Beijing 2022 Olympics was held on 16 February, on "Ice River" course at the Yanqing National Alpine Ski Centre  in Yanqing District. Clément Noël of France won the event, this became his first Olympic medal. Johannes Strolz of Austria won the silver medal, and Sebastian Foss-Solevåg of Norway bronze.

André Myhrer, the 2018 champion, retired from competitions. The silver medalist, Ramon Zenhäusern, and the bronze medalist, Michael Matt, qualified for the Olympics. During the World Cup season, six slalom events were held before the Olympics: Lucas Braathen was leading the ranking, followed by Foss-Solevåg, Manuel Feller, Linus Straßer, and Daniel Yule. Foss-Solevåg was the reigning world champion, with Adrian Pertl and Henrik Kristoffersen being the silver and bronze medalists, respectively.

Qualification

Results
Results are as follows:

References

Men's alpine skiing at the 2022 Winter Olympics